40S ribosomal protein S10 is a protein that in humans is encoded by the RPS10 gene.

Function 

Ribosomes, the organelles that catalyze protein synthesis, consist of a small 40S subunit and a large 60S subunit. Together these subunits are composed of 4 RNA species and approximately 80 structurally distinct proteins. This gene encodes a ribosomal protein that is a component of the 40S subunit. The protein belongs to the S10E family of ribosomal proteins. It is located in the cytoplasm. As is typical for genes encoding ribosomal proteins, there are multiple processed pseudogenes of this gene dispersed through the genome.

Clinical significance 

Variable expression of this gene in colorectal cancers compared to adjacent normal tissues has been observed, although no correlation between the level of expression and the severity of the disease has been found.
Mutations in the RPS10 gene can cause Diamond–Blackfan anemia, a congenital anemia sometimes associated with bone marrow failure.

Interactions
RPS10 has been shown to interact with PTTG1.

References

Further reading

External links
 GeneReviews/NCBI/NIH/UW entry on Diamond–Blackfan Anemia
 OMIM entries on Diamond–Blackfan Anemia

Ribosomal proteins